Hello Neighbor is a survival horror stealth game developed by Russian studio Dynamic Pixels and published by tinyBuild. Initially released as public alphas from 2016 to 2017, it received a full release for Microsoft Windows and Xbox One on December 8, 2017, and later for PlayStation 4, Nintendo Switch, iOS and Android on July 26, 2018.

In the game, players play as a citizen, who just moved into the neighborhood, and try to break into their neighbor's house. Their goal is to successfully sneak into the basement of the neighbor's house to uncover a dark secret while avoiding being caught by him. The game's artificial intelligence (AI) modifies the neighbor's behavior based on the player's past actions, such as setting traps along paths the player followed in a previous attempt.

While the initial alpha versions of Hello Neighbor were received positively, the final product was met with largely negative reviews. Critics panned the gameplay, control scheme, and technical performance, although some praised the story, mystery elements, and art style. The game spawned a franchise, beginning with a prequel, Hello Neighbor: Hide and Seek, released in December 2018. Two multiplayer spin-offs, Secret Neighbor and Hello Engineer, were released in October 2019 and October 2021, respectively. A standalone sequel, Hello Neighbor 2, was released on December 6, 2022.

Gameplay
In Hello Neighbor, the player finds themselves moving into a new house across the street from a mysterious neighbor who is behaving in a paranoid manner and seems to be keeping a secret in his basement. The player's task is to break into the neighbor's home and solve a series of puzzles to gather the items needed to unlock and access his basement. As the player explores the neighbor's house, they must not be spotted by the mysterious neighbor, or they will be chased down, and if the player is not quick enough to hide or escape, then they will be captured. The player can stun the neighbor by throwing objects at him for an easier escape. If the player is caught (or suffers a serious injury), they will be sent back to their own house and will have to break in again. Upon starting again, the player must be more careful, as the neighbor will deduce movements from the last attempt to set up traps. However, the player can use the game settings to turn on "friendly" neighbor mode, preventing the neighbor from setting these traps and causing him to be less aggressive in his pursuits. However, he is still to be avoided at all costs.

The game is divided into four parts: Act 1, Act 2, Act 3, and Act Finale. The game is played in a first-person perspective, and the player must aim a reticle at certain objects to interact with them or to throw or use a currently held item (for example, throwing a ball at a window or aiming a crowbar at nails to remove them). Up to four items can be kept in an inventory space. Items of the same kind cannot be stacked together in one slot.

Plot

A child named Nicky Roth is chasing a ball down the street when he hears screams coming from his neighbor's house which belongs to Theodore Peterson. Nicky goes to investigate and witnesses Mr. Peterson locking someone in his basement. Nicky sneaks into the house, finds the key to the basement, and enters. He finds that Mr. Peterson has converted his basement into a makeshift underground dungeon, but finds no sign of any prisoner. Mr. Peterson then chases Nicky and locks him up in the dungeon, thus beginning Act 2. He manages to escape his cell and reach the surface, only to find that Mr. Peterson has erected a massive fence around his property to prevent escape. Nicky is forced to solve several puzzles to find a way to escape Mr. Peterson's property. Once he crosses the fence, he flees back to his home, and Mr. Peterson does not give chase.

During Acts 1 and 2, if Nicky is caught by Mr. Peterson before he can finish his objectives, he will have vivid nightmares about Mr. Peterson's past. These nightmares gradually reveal Mr. Peterson's backstory, implying that he was once a happy family man. However, after his wife and daughter were killed in two separate accidents, he became a recluse and, in his grief, locked his son in the basement to prevent him from getting hurt. Mr. Peterson's backstory is further explained in the book Hello Neighbor: Missing Pieces and the prequel game Hello Neighbor: Hide and Seek.

Years later, an adult Nicky is evicted from his apartment and decides to return to his old family home. His childhood town finally succumbed to its cruel fate. He finds the house in disrepair while Mr. Peterson's home is also nothing but a pile of ruins. While inspecting the ruins, Nicky is haunted by a dark shadow-like creature ("The Thing"), and he returns to his home where he finds an old picture of himself as a child. After answering the phone, Nicky sees the shadow monster again. Believing he's hallucinating, he falls asleep as an act of self-therapy. He is awoken by a child's scream and discovers Mr. Peterson's house is back, and more surreal than before, due to his trauma. Nicky navigates the house and has surreal experiences, such as learning to double jump by shrinking down and trying to turn on the light that is far out of reach.

Eventually, he enters the basement, now older and more surreal. When Nicky gets out of the basement, he finds himself trying to knock down a giant Mr. Peterson to get inside a house on his back. After doing so, he must protect a younger version of himself from an enormous dark shadowy figure called "The Thing". Each time The Thing attacks and Nicky protects his younger self, Nicky grows larger until he can fight The Thing. After The Thing is defeated, Nicky sees Mr. Peterson in a small two-room house. When he spots Nicky he runs in desperation towards the window as if to ask for help, but then shrugs his shoulders and turns away with sadness. In the other room is a much smaller Thing. Mr. Peterson has boarded the door up on his side and placed a chair against it, which meant Mr. Peterson never overcame his fears. The Thing is seen standing right by the door on the other side. Behind him is another door with an exit sign above it.

It is implied throughout the events of the game that most of Act 3 and the Finale is a nightmare occurring in Nicky's head and that his escape from the house signifies him finally coming to terms with his kidnapping as a child at the hands of Mr. Peterson. However, Nikita Kolesnikov (the game's designer) confirmed that nothing in the game is a dream.

Development
The Development of the game started in 2014. The game was released as an alpha build on Dynamic Pixels' website in 2015. It was later approved for sale as an early access game by the Steam Greenlight program and a Kickstarter campaign was launched to fund further development. The studio signed a deal with tinyBuild to publish the game. The Pre-Alpha version of the game was released in September 29, 2016. The Alpha 1 version of Hello Neighbor was released on October 26, 2016. Alpha 2 was released on November 22, 2016. Alpha 3 was released on December 22, 2016. Alpha 4 was released on May 4, 2017.

The game went into the beta phase on July 25, 2017. For Halloween 2017, a promotional mod was released including multiple elements from the indie game Bendy and the Ink Machine. The mod includes a black and yellow tint, ink, music from the game and multiple appearances of Bendy. The game was originally set for a full release on August 29, 2017, but was delayed until December 8, 2017.

The game was released for Microsoft Windows and Xbox One on December 8, 2017. A timed Microsoft exclusive, Hello Neighbor was later ported to the Nintendo Switch, PlayStation 4 and mobile devices. The mobile versions of the game are only supported on a limited number of devices and come with a free trial that allows players to play through Act 1, with the option to unlock the remaining two Acts and the Finale with an in-game purchase.

Franchise

Games 
In July 2020, tinyBuild acquired the development team from Dynamic Pixels to establish a new studio by the name of Eerie Guest Studios and invested  into the Hello Neighbor series.

Hello Guest
Hello guest was a spin-off of Hello Neighbor made by TinyBuild, the game took place in the mysterious 'Golden Apple Amusement Park, and the game revolved around solving puzzles and outsmarting the guest, a learning AI similar to the neighbor from the first game, all while attempting to restart the roller coaster. This game was dropped onto mobile devices, swiftly deleted, and has not been acknowledged by TinyBuild as part of the franchise, despite their continued use of the Guest character introduced in this game.

Hello Neighbor: Hide & Seek 
A prequel to Hello Neighbor, titled Hello Neighbor: Hide & Seek, was announced during PAX West in August 2018, and released on December 7th 2018 on the same platforms as the original game, including non-Microsoft systems. Set several years before the events of the original game, Hide & Seek deals with the events in Mr. Peterson's life that caused him to become a recluse. The gameplay is similar to that of Hello Neighbor, but instead of Nicky, the player controls Mr. Peterson's daughter Mya as she plays hide-and-seek with her brother, Aaron (who takes the place of the neighbor), in various fictitious scenarios. The story is told through cutscenes in-between levels, which reveal that the children's mother dies in a car crash sometime during the events of the game. In his grief, Aaron later pushes Mya off the roof of the house, resulting in her accidental death.

Secret Neighbor 
Secret Neighbor, a multiplayer spin-off of Hello Neighbor, was announced on June 10, 2018 and released on October 24th 2019 for Xbox and PC. Set between the first two acts of Hello Neighbor, it follows Nicky's friends as they try to rescue him from Mr. Peterson's house. The children are represented by different classes, each with their unique skillsets and abilities, and must collect keys required to unlock the door to the house's basement. However, one of the children is Mr. Peterson in disguise, and also has various class-based abilities at his disposal that can be used to confuse, trick, capture, or otherwise prevent the children from achieving their goal.

Hello Engineer 
Hello Engineer, a multiplayer machinery-building construction game set in the Hello Neighbor universe, was announced on October 20, 2020. A gameplay reveal trailer was released four days later. In Hello Engineer, a group of players explore an open world based on the abandoned Golden Apple amusement park and must collect scrap to build various machines while avoiding Mr. Peterson's attempts to catch them. The game was released for the cloud gaming service Google Stadia on October 26, 2021.

Hello Neighbor Diaries 
Hello Neighbor Diaries, a mobile spin-off to the first Hello Neighbor, released in 11 regions on June 22, 2022 as a test launch and is yet to be released globally. It was originally released as Nicky's Diaries on the Mobile Port of the first game. Set in the book franchise, young Nicky Roth must piece together the mysteries from his childhood.

Hello Neighbor 2 
A new Hello Neighbor game initially titled Hello Guest was later revealed to be the Pre-Alpha of Hello Neighbor 2 and on July 23, 2020, it was announced as the official sequel to the original game. On this same day, Alpha 1 was also released, with Alpha 1.5 releasing on October 26, 2020. The sequel was announced to be available for Microsoft Windows and Xbox Series X/S. On December 10, 2021, it was announced that a closed Beta would be released on April 7, 2022 which would only be available to those who pre-ordered the game. On February 10, 2022, it was announced that Hello Neighbor 2 would also release on PlayStation 4 and 5. tinyBuild announced that the full game was expected to release on December 6, 2022, which it did.

Hello Neighbor VR: Search and Rescue 
A new VR title in the Hello Neighbor franchise titled Hello Neighbor: Search and Rescue was announced on November 3 2022. The game is being worked on by Steel Wool Studios in collaboration with tinyBuild. The game was released on the PlayStation VR and PlayStation VR2, and the Meta Quest 2.

Animated series 
An animated series based on Hello Neighbor titled was announced on 17 April 2020, with a pilot episode releasing on YouTube the same day. The pilot was watched by more than 11 million viewers within the first week, which to tinyBuild's CEO Alex Nichiporchik, "demonstrated the strength of Hello Neighbor as a franchise". A teaser was released on tinyBuild's Youtube channel on 1 December 2022, as well as the title for the show, Hello Neighbor: Welcome to Raven Brooks. The first episode of the series was released on 11 December 2022, produced from Man of Action with the rest of the show's episodes being released before the end of 2023.

Reception

The game received generally negative reviews by critics, criticizing its gameplay, control scheme and technical performance, while some praised the story aspects and art style. According to the review aggregation website Metacritic, Hello Neighbor received "generally unfavorable reviews" on all platforms.

References

External links
 

2017 video games
Android (operating system) games
2010s horror video games
Survival horror video games
Indie video games
IOS games
Nintendo Switch games
PlayStation 4 games
Stealth video games
Video games with Steam Workshop support
TinyBuild games
First-person video games
Video games adapted into comics
Video games developed in Russia
Windows games
Xbox Cloud Gaming games
Xbox One games
Xbox Play Anywhere games
Xbox One X enhanced games
Unreal Engine games
Stadia games